ALRI 4th Division (Indonesian: Angkatan Laut Republik Indonesia Divisi IV) was a formation of Indonesian Navy during Indonesian National Revolution. It was responsible for military operations in Kalimantan during the war. Founded on 4 April 1946, it was divided into three sectors each with their own assigned region in Kalimantan. The division was famous for its involvement in Kalimantan Physical Revolution.

Structure 
The division was divided into three sectors each with its own assigned region within Kalimantan.

 ALRI 4th Division Sector A (South Kalimantan based in South Hulu Sungai Regency)
 ALRI 4th Division Sector B (West Kalimantan based in Pontianak)
 ALRI 4th Division Sector C (East Kalimantan)

References 

Indonesian Navy
Indonesian National Revolution
Kalimantan